Iskuzhino (İsquja) is a rural locality (a village) in Ravilovsky Selsoviet, Abzelilovsky District, Bashkortostan, Russia. The population was 145 as of 2010. There are 5 streets.

Geography 
Iskuzhino is located 33 km south of Askarovo (the district's administrative centre) by road. Kalmakovo is the nearest rural locality.

References 

Rural localities in Abzelilovsky District